Guo Jingjing (born October 15, 1981, in Baoding, Hebei) is a retired Chinese female diver, and multi-time Olympic gold medalist and world champion. Guo is tied with her partner Wu Minxia for winning the most Olympic medals (6) of any female diver and she won the 3m springboard event at five consecutive World Championships. She announced her retirement in 2011.

Career

She took up diving when she was six years old at the Baoding Training Base. She started training in competitive diving in 1988, and was selected to dive for the Chinese national team in 1992. Guo first competed at the Olympics in 1996.  Had she duplicated her performances from many other events, including the 1995 Chinese Nationals, 1995 Dive Canada, or 1996 Chinese Olympic Trials, she would have easily won gold ahead of teammate Fu Mingxia, but had a disastrous final, missing all 5 dives, and finished in 5th place.  Her coach leading up to the 2008 Olympics was Zhong Shaozhen.

During the 2004 Summer Olympics she won a gold medal in the 3-meter women's synchronized springboard along with Wu Minxia, before winning her first individual Olympic gold in the 3-meter women's springboard.

After the 2004 Summer Olympics, Guo became a Chinese national sports figure, with a contract with McDonald's, as well as multiple other endorsement contracts. She was later banned by the national team for excessive commercial activities, but was accepted back to the team when she agreed to focus on diving and give up many promotional activities. She was also made to surrender nearly 4 million dollars she had earned from her endorsements. Tian Liang, a fellow Olympic gold medalist offered the same deal as Guo, declined to pay back the money to the government, and was excluded from the Olympic games. Guo is the leading member of the Chinese national women's diving team, and is known in China as "The Princess of Diving". Guo announced on November 23, 2006, she would retire following the 2008 Summer Olympics.

Guo won two more gold medals at the 2008 Olympic Games in Beijing. At the end of the Beijing Games, Guo became the most decorated female Olympic diver, and tied fellow Chinese athlete Fu Mingxia, and Americans Pat McCormick and Greg Louganis with the most gold medals (four).  Guo won the gold medal in the women's 3-meter springboard with a total of 415.35 points. The silver medal was awarded to Yuliya Pakhalina of Russia, whose score was 398.60, followed by Wu Minxia of China with 389.85 for the bronze medal.  In synchronized diving, the defending champions Guo, and Wu, who won the event in the 2004 Athens Olympics and three World Championships, had led the entire competition in Beijing, winning the gold medal, with Yuliya Pakhalina and Anastasia Pozdnyakova of Russia, who posted 323.61, winning Silver.

It was confirmed in January 2011 that Guo had decided to retire, and she would not compete in the 2012 Summer Olympics.  She was quoted as saying, "I think I have fulfilled my task, so the London Games is not what I have in mind now. The chances should be left to other talents in the team."

In 2016, she and her husband Kenneth Fok participated in The Amazing Race China 3, based on a CBS's travel-reality program of the same name. After competing ten Olympic-themed legs, they emerged as the winning team of the season.

Personal life

Guo's social activities after the Athens Olympics were the subject of scrutiny in Mainland Chinese and Hong Kong media news outlets. Guo made entertainment headlines in China when the paparazzi published a photograph of her dining with Kenneth Fok Kai-kong, the grandson of Hong Kong tycoon Henry Fok. Guo did not deny the relationship, and has been photographed many times with Kenneth Fok in public.

The couple married in Hong Kong on November 8, 2012. On August 27, 2013, Guo gave birth to a baby boy. Second baby girl on April 21, 2017, and third baby daughter on January 1, 2019.

During Guo's history in diving, the long-term high-pressure training, made damages to her knees, her retina and her myopia. In September 2008, Guo had to undergo surgery to repair a detached retina in both her eyes and her surgery was undertaken by Hong Kong ophthalmologist Dennis Lam. Earlier in 2001, she underwent surgery to repair a detached retina in her right eye, but spent only a few months out of the water. Since then, her eyesight has declined markedly.

Major achievements
1995 World Cup – 1st Synchronized Platform & 3m Synchronized Springboard
1996 Olympic Games – 5th Platform
1998 World Championships – 2nd 3m Springboard
1999 World Cup – 1st 3m Synchronized Springboard; 3rd 3m Springboard
2000 World Cup – 1st 3m Springboard; 2nd 3m Synchronized Springboard
2000 Olympic Games – 2nd 3m Springboard & Synchronized Springboard
2001 World Championships – 1st 3m Springboard & Synchronized Springboard
2002 World Cup – 1st 1m & 3m Springboard; 2nd 3m Synchronized Springboard
2002 Asian Games – 1st 3m Springboard & Synchronized Springboard
2003 FINA Diving Grand Prix (Australia/China) – 1st 3m Springboard & Synchronized Springboard
2003 World Championships – 1st 3m Springboard & Synchronized Springboard
2004 World Cup – 1st 3m Synchronized Springboard; 2nd 3m Springboard
2004 Olympic Games – 1st 3m Springboard & Synchronized Springboard
2005 World Championships – 1st 3m Springboard & Synchronized Springboard
2006 Asian Games – 1st 3m Synchronized Springboard
2007 World Championships – 1st 3m Springboard & Synchronized Springboard
2008 Olympic Games 1st Women's 3m Synchronised Springboard
2008 Olympic Games 1st Women's 3m Springboard
2009 World Championships – 1st 3m Springboard & Synchronized Springboard

References

External links
2008 Beijing Olympics Diving News, images, and scores from NBC.
"Guo Jingjing", number 9 on Time’s list of "100 Olympic Athletes To Watch"

1981 births
Living people
Divers at the 1996 Summer Olympics
Divers at the 2000 Summer Olympics
Divers at the 2004 Summer Olympics
Divers at the 2008 Summer Olympics
Olympic divers of China
Olympic gold medalists for China
Olympic silver medalists for China
Sportspeople from Baoding
Olympic medalists in diving
Chinese female divers
Asian Games medalists in diving
Divers at the 1998 Asian Games
Divers at the 2002 Asian Games
Divers at the 2006 Asian Games
Asian Games gold medalists for China
Medalists at the 2008 Summer Olympics
Medalists at the 2004 Summer Olympics
World Aquatics Championships medalists in diving
Medalists at the 1998 Asian Games
Medalists at the 2002 Asian Games
Medalists at the 2006 Asian Games
Universiade medalists in diving
Universiade gold medalists for China
Universiade silver medalists for China
Medalists at the 2001 Summer Universiade
Medalists at the 2003 Summer Universiade
Medalists at the 2005 Summer Universiade
The Amazing Race contestants
Reality show winners